Messiah University is a private interdenominational evangelical Christian university in Mechanicsburg, Pennsylvania.

History

The school was founded as Messiah Bible School and Missionary Training Home in 1909 by the Brethren in Christ Church. Originally located in Harrisburg, Pennsylvania, in the home of Messiah's first president, Samuel Rogers (S.R.) Smith, a local businessman and leader in the Brethren in Christ Church, the school was moved to the village of Grantham in 1911, following the construction of the campus' first building, Old Main. (The university now uses a Mechanicsburg mailing address, but its main campus is still located in Grantham.) The building was constructed on land donated by S.R. Smith, who had moved his home and various business interests outside of the city to allow for growth in the farmlands surrounding Grantham. In the early years, the school offered a high school curriculum and several Bible programs. By 1921, it had also become a junior college, making it the second junior college in Pennsylvania, and changed its name to Messiah Bible School.

By the 1950s, the school offered four-year college programs and accordingly in 1951 it changed its name to Messiah College.  Messiah discontinued its high school program in 1959 and added liberal arts programs during this period.  It was accredited as a four-year college in 1963, and continued to expand its liberal arts programs.

In 1964, Messiah College took over the operations of Upland College in Upland, California, a Brethren in Christ Church college that had been operating since the 1920s.  The Upland campus was closed and all operations were consolidated to Pennsylvania. Four years later, Messiah College opened its Philadelphia Campus in a partnership with Temple University. This campus closed at the end of the Spring 2014 semester.

In 2002, Messiah College's Harrisburg Institute was founded in downtown Harrisburg. Its purpose is to serve as an academic and research center and connect students with the unique needs of an urban environment. The institute also provides housing for up to 25 students.

Following the US Justice Department Scandal involving alumna Monica Goodling in 2007, several members of the media ridiculed Messiah College. Jon Stewart on The Daily Show referred to Messiah as a school "where people have faith that they'll receive a quality education, and yet somehow it never arrives," and "that everyone in the God business knows (Messiah) is a 'savior school'." Bill Maher also mocked Messiah, calling it "the home of the Fighting Christies."

Even though it is no longer owned by the Brethren in Christ Church, Messiah continues to be influenced by its traditions, primarily in the Anabaptist, but also the Radical Pietist and Wesleyan holiness movements. Today, it is a nondenominational Christian college, with a faith base that is broadly evangelical and includes students and employees from a variety of denominations and Christian faith traditions.

In July 2020, Messiah College became Messiah University.

2008 Compassion Forum
The Compassion Forum was a question-and-answer session hosted by Messiah in which CNN commentators Jon Meacham and Campbell Brown as well as select members of the audience posed questions about Faith and Politics to Democratic political candidates Hillary Clinton and Barack Obama. The forum took place on April 13, 2008, and was given live national coverage by CNN. The event was organized by the religious organization Faith in Public Life. John McCain was offered an invitation to participate in the event but declined the invitation, citing a schedule conflict.

Academics
Messiah University offers more than 150 majors, minors, concentrations, and pre-professional advising options  in four schools: the School of the Arts; the School of Business, Education and Social Sciences; the School of Science, Engineering and Health; and the School of the Humanities. In addition to major requirements, there is a general education curriculum, required for all students. General education requirements include but are not limited to theology courses, a philosophy, a literature, a social science, an art course, a world views class, physical education courses, first year and senior seminars, and a comprehensive first-year seminar course added in 2009 called Created and Called for Community.

Messiah University awards Bachelor of Arts and Bachelor of Science degrees in the liberal and applied arts and sciences. Specialized programs include extensive off-campus study, individualized majors, independent study, service-learning, internships, allied health programs in partnership with other institutions and a College Honors Program. Some majors allow students to graduate one or two semesters early, depending on their particular field of study.

In 2009, Messiah University launched its first graduate programs, and currently offers online master's programs in business, conducting, counseling, education, higher education, leadership, occupational therapy and nursing. It also offers various certificate programs in those fields along with an ACEND-accredited dietetic internship program.

Messiah University students have earned academic honors and fellowships such as Rhodes, Fulbright, Carnegie, Truman and Boren scholarships. Joy Yu-Ho Wang became Messiah University's first Rhodes Scholar in 1997.

Messiah University uses the 4-1-3 academic calendar system where the academic year is divided into Fall, January, and Spring Terms. The January Term, or J-Term, is a three-and-a-half-week period where students can choose to take one or two courses intensively, participate in a cross cultural study program, sign up for the popular Skiing and Snowboarding class, or simply stay home for an extended vacation.

The university is accredited by the Middle States Commission on Higher Education. Academic programs in engineering, dietetics, nursing, athletic training, music, social work, education, theater, and business are each accredited by professional associations.

International programs
Messiah University has a network of programs through which students can study abroad. In 2015, the institution was ranked 25th among all undergraduate institutions in the country that send students to study abroad by the Institute for International Education's Open Doors Report. In 2014–2015, more than 500 Messiah students earned academic credit by studying abroad in more than 40 different countries.

Cross-cultural courses are offered during January and May terms. These trips are led by faculty members, and students earn credits by participating in an intense three-week study of a particular geographic region or culture. Messiah University students can also participate in the International Business Institute (IBI), an overseas program in international economics and business designed to give students an opportunity to integrate academic study with international field experience. Students who travel with IBI during the summer visit corporate headquarters, manufacturing plants, and government and international agencies in Europe, India, and China. Students can also work in a variety of fields through an international internship.

Athletics
The Messiah University Falcons compete in NCAA Division III athletics with 23 different intercollegiate athletic teams.  Messiah is a member of the Middle Atlantic Conferences. The Messiah University mascot is the Falcon, which was given the name Fandango in 2006. Through the Senior Class Gift from the Class of 2017, the mascot changed his look and was renamed to Flex. Their local rival is Elizabethtown College.

Messiah's men's and women's soccer teams both won the NCAA Division III National Championship in 2005, 2008, 2009 and 2012. The Falcons men's soccer team are eleven-time national champions, winning the NCAA Men's Division III Soccer Championship in 2000, 2002, 2004, 2005, 2006, 2008, 2009, 2010, 2012, 2013 and 2017.  Messiah's women's soccer team has won the NCAA Division III Women's Soccer Championship in 2005, 2008, 2009, 2011, 2012, and 2019.  Messiah University is the only college in the NCAA to win both the men's and women's soccer national championship in the same year, and they have achieved that distinction four times (in 2005, 2008, 2009 and 2012). In 2010, Messiah was ranked by U.S. News & World Report as the third best school in the nation for soccer fans.

The women's field hockey team won their first NCAA Division III National Championship in 2016 .

The women's softball team won their first NCAA Division III national championship in 2009.

In October 2009, USA Today ran a national front-page sports feature profiling Messiah University's success in bringing together the two aspects of its mission statement, "Pursuing Athletic Excellence. Developing Christian Character."

The men's wrestling team has won five individual NCAA Division III National Championships, including Lucas Malmberg who won back-to-back titles at 125 lbs. in 2016 and 2017. The team finished as the national runner-up in 2016.

In 2017 Tim Moses became the first-ever NCAA Division III men's pole vaulter to earn All-American honors in every indoor and outdoor season (eight total).

The men's and women's track & field teams have won five individual NCAA Division III National Championships.

The Falcons have earned 43 CoSIDA Academic All-American honors in their history, including 32 since 2011.

Spiritual life

Community Covenant
Students at Messiah University are required to sign a Community Covenant upon entering. The document states that every person is created in the image of God, and that there are certain responsibilities of living in community that must also be assumed in relation to God, others, and his creation.

First and foremost, the Community Covenant affirms belief in God and the Bible. Specifically, the Community Covenant requires commitment to academic integrity, responsible decision making in light of Christian values, and balancing personal freedom with concern for others. Practically, the Covenant bans both on- and off-campus the use of illegal drugs, alcohol, and tobacco as well as gambling, profanity, "occult practices", sexual intercourse outside of marriage, and homosexual behavior. It also prescribes the avoidance of drunkenness, stealing, and dishonesty. The covenant also prohibits certain attitudes, such as greed, lust, and jealousy, but allows that these attributes are typically expressed less outwardly.

LGBT prohibition
Messiah's student handbook prohibits "same-sex sexual expression" including identifying as a couple or expressing physical intimacy, although heterosexual couples are specifically allowed to do these things by the handbook. Unlike many religious schools with a similar policy, Messiah has never requested a Title IX exemption for permission to discriminate against LGBT students.

The university's stance on homosexuality, as stated in the Community Covenant, has been a source of contention and controversy amongst the student body, administration, and alumni. A number of articles have been published concerning the issue in the university's student newspaper, the Swinging Bridge, as well as in local media.

An alumni group, Inclusive Alumni, was formed in support of Isaiah Thomas and aimed at changing the institution's policy. Isaiah Thomas was a student who decided to transfer out of Messiah in May 2011, after claims of harassment by students and also a professor. He also claims he received a death threat via Facebook. He claims that the institution said that they followed up on his claims but refused to change the policy.

Chapel
Undergraduate students at Messiah University are required to attend 14 chapel services each semester.

The mission of Chapel is to be "a central expression of our identity as a community of Christians with a deep commitment to spiritual growth and academic excellence."  Chapels are intended to "nurture holistic Christian faith through worship that expresses our faith with a full range of contemporary and traditional form, teaching that connects God's Word and our world, and community building that affirms our common identity in Christ and celebrates our diversity."

In addition to chapel services, Messiah University provides other opportunities for spiritual growth throughout students' university experience, including discipleship groups, ministry outreach teams, community service, mission trips and numerous other special programs such as "Powerhouse," a weekly student-led contemporary worship service.

Student activities
Students at Messiah University can spend their free time playing in intramural sports leagues, participating in various clubs, watching on-campus movies, and hanging out at local diners, among other things.  Underclassmen also participate in floor activities organized by their RAs. The Student Government Association funds 70+ organizations on campus that aim at providing for a co-curricular atmosphere conducive to a holistic education and enjoyable experience while enrolled at Messiah. The SGA also provides students with unique access towards influencing governance and overall institutional prerogatives.

Messiah University's Student Activities Board (SAB) is an executive organization that attempts to help students engage with popular culture by bringing different concerts, films, and other forms of entertainment to campus. They also plan dances, coffeehouses, cultural engagement and other special activities (like outings, Broadway trips, and festivals) for students. SAB hosts a free concert series every Wednesday night, known as "B-sides", which is held in the Larsen Student Union building. Local, indie and up-and-coming bands and artists play every Wednesday night throughout the school year. These concerts are free not only to students, but to the public as well.

Traditions

Messiah University has, over the years, accumulated a number of traditions. Some of the most well-known traditions include attending soccer games (including the popular White-Out March during homecoming), finals week activities such as the Midnight Scream, and candlelight worship services. One of the oldest traditions is known as "creeking".  This tradition started out as a way of congratulating male students who had recently gotten engaged.  The student would be taken to the nearby Yellow Breeches Creek by his friends and thrown in. It is also common for people to be "creeked" on their birthdays. The tradition has been extended to the female population.

Notable people

Alumni
Vanessa Alfano (1999), founder of healthystyleny.com and former American weather anchor for WWOR-TV in New York City
Ernest Boyer (1948), Chancellor of the State University of New York, U.S. Commissioner of Education, and President of the Carnegie Foundation for the Advancement of Teaching
Chris Boyles (2002), decathlete
Dave Brandt (1985), professional soccer coach
Lynn H. Cohick (1984), New Testament scholar and provost at Northern Seminary
Ray Crist (1916), chemist who participated in the Manhattan Project
Brian Duffield (2008), screenwriter
Peter Enns (1982), Biblical scholar, theologian, and writer
Monica Goodling (1995), U.S. government lawyer and George W. Bush administration political appointee
Peter Greer (1997), anti-poverty advocate, author, and president and CEO of Hope International (Christian microfinance)
Chris Heisey (attended 2003–2006, did not graduate), Major League Baseball player
Derreck Kayongo (1995), CEO of the National Center for Civil and Human Rights
Levi Landis (2003), curator, musician, festival producer, and CEO of GoggleWorks Center for the Arts. 
Brian Sell (2000), long-distance runner
Jay Smith, Christian apologist
David J. Steinberg (1986), late actor
Brennan Swain (1993), The Amazing Race 1 winner
Gregory Alan Thornbury (1993), president of The King's College
Steve Thurston (1998), journalist, entrepreneur, and CEO of Integrity Ministries (Integridad Network, Inc.)

Faculty
 Robin Collins, American philosopher
 Douglas Jacobsen, religious studies scholar and author
 Donald Kraybill, former Provost of Messiah College and former professor at Elizabethtown College
 Ron Sider, theologian and social activist

Demographics

Messiah College CDP is a census-designated place located in Upper Allen Township, Cumberland County, in the state of Pennsylvania. It is located near Grantham and consists of the campus of Messiah University. It was first listed as a CDP in 2010. Per the 2020 census, the population was 2,841.

2020 census

References

External links
 Official website
 Official athletics website

 
Educational institutions established in 1909
Universities and colleges in Cumberland County, Pennsylvania
1909 establishments in Pennsylvania
Evangelicalism in Pennsylvania
Council for Christian Colleges and Universities
Liberal arts colleges in Pennsylvania
Private universities and colleges in Pennsylvania